The 2012 Moscow Victory Day Parade was held on 9 May 2012 on Moscow's Red Square to commemorate the 67th anniversary of the capitulation of Nazi Germany in 1945. The parade marked the Soviet Union's victory in the Great Patriotic War on the very day on the signing of the German act of capitulation, on the very midnight of May 9, 1945 (Russian time). Newly inaugurated President of Russia Vladimir Putin made his ninth victory holiday address in this parade.

Preparations 
Since October 2011, the parade has been well prepared. Rehearsals began to be held by the various participating units.

Beginning from March 2012, in the parade practice site in Alabino, Moscow Oblast, parade rehearsal were held from the 19th of that month until April 23, and from April 21 and 22 the parade's Mobile Column began its Moscow test runs.

Full rehearsals in Moscow itself started on the final Thursday and weekend of April and lasted until May 6. These also included separate practice runs for the military bands and the mobile column.

The event 
Among the attendees were Prime Minister Dmitry Medvedev, Chairman of the State Duma Sergei Naryshkin, and Mayor Sergey Sobyanin. Over 14,000 troops participated in the ceremony. For the first time in a year, due to the massive unpopularity of the new Battledress duty uniforms worn last year by almost all the parading units, all the participants, save for those in the mobile column, began wearing dress uniforms again. The entire marchpast segment for 2012 was composed of the following Russian uniformed services:
 Armed Forces of the Russian Federation
 Russian Ground Forces
 Russian Air Force
 Russian Navy
 Russian Naval Infantry
 Russian Airborne Troops
 Strategic Missile Troops
 Russian Aerospace Defence Forces
 Russian Railway Troops
 Border Guard of the Federal Security Service of the Russian Federation
 Internal Troops of the Ministry of Internal Affairs of the Russian Federation
 Ministry of Emergency Situations

The mobile column was composed of more than a hundred military vehicles from various military units and a squadron of Army Air Center Mi-8s carrying the Flag of Russia and the flags of the Armed Forces flying past Red Square closed the parade segment.

This year's combined military band, conducted by Lieutenant General Valery Khalilov in what is his 10th Victory Day appearance as Senior Director of Music of the Military Band Service of the Armed Forces of the Russian Federation, will have more than 1,100 bandsmen and for the first time in 3 years will see the return of the Field Marshal Alexander Suvorov Moscow Military Music School's Corps of Drums leading the parade in its dark blue and red dress uniform, as it has always done since the Moscow Victory Parade of 1945. The parade finale saw the bands perform the March Borodino and a special arrangement of Farewell of Slavianka, the latter being in honor of the centennial anniversary of its composition and the former being in honor of the bicentennial of the Patriotic War of 1812.

 Music 

 Flag procession, Inspection, and Address
 Sacred War (Священная Война) by Alexander Alexandrov
 March of the Preobrazhensky Regiment (Марш Преображенского Полка)
 Slow March to Carry the War Flag (Встречный Марш для выноса Боевого Знамени) by Dmitriy Valentinovich Kadeyev
 Slow March of the Officers Schools (Встречный Марш офицерских училищ) by Semyon Tchernetsky
 Slow March of the Guards of the Navy (Гвардейский Встречный Марш Военно-Морского Флота) by Nikolai Pavlocich Ivanov-Radkevich
 Slow March of the Tankmen (Встречный Марш Танкистов) by Semyon Tchernetsky
 Slow March (Встречный Марш) by Evgeny Aksyonov
 Glory (Славься) by Mikhail Glinka
 Parade Fanfare All Listen! (Парадная Фанфара “Слушайте все!”) by Andrei Golovin
 State Anthem of the Russian Federation (Государственный Гимн Российской Федерации) by Alexander Alexandrov
 Signal Retreat (Сигнал “Отбой”)

 Infantry Column
 Triumph of the Winners (Триумф Победителей)
 Air March (Авиамарш) by Yuliy Abramovich Khait
 Crew is One Family (Экипаж - одна семья) by Viktor Vasilyevich Pleshak
 March of the Cosmonauts/Friends, I believe (Марш Космонавтов /Я верю, друзья) by Oskar Borisovich Feltsman
 Artillery March (Марш Артиллеристов) by Tikhon Khrennikov
 We Need One Victory (Нам Нужна Одна Победа) by Bulat Shalvovich Okudzhava
 Ballad of a Soldier (Баллада о Солдате) by Vasily Pavlovich Solovyov-Sedoy
 We are the Army of the People (Мы Армия Народа) by Georgy Viktorovich Mavsesya
 To Serve Russia (Служить России) by Eduard Cemyonovich Khanok
 The Entry of the Red Army in Budapest (Вхождение Красной Армии в Будапешт) by Semyon Tchernetsky
 March Youth (Марш "Молодёжный") by Valery Khalilov
 March Hero (Марш “Герой”) by Unknown
 On Guard for the Peace (На страже Мира) by Boris Alexandrovich Diev
 On the Road (В Путь) by Vasily Pavlovich Solovyov-Sedoy
 Victory Day (День Победы) by David Fyodorovich Tukhmanov

 Mobile and Air columns
 March General Miloradovich (Марш “Генерал Милорадович”) by Valery Khalilov
 Invincible and Legendary (Несокрушимая и легендарная) by Alexandr Alexandrov
 March “Three Tankmen” (Марш “Три Танкиста”) by Pokrass Brothers
 March of the Soviet Tankists (Марш сове́тских танки́стов) by Pokrass Brothers
 Katyusha (Катюша) by Matvey Blanter
 March Victory (Марш “Победа”) by Albert Mikhailovich Arutyunov
 Artillery March (Марш Артиллеристов) by Tikhon Khrennikov
 Long Live our State (Да здравствует наша держава) by Boris Alexandrov

 Conclusion
 March Borodino (Марш “Бородино”) by I. Rayevsky
 Farewell of Slavianka (Прощание Славянки) by Vasiliy Agapkin

 Full list of participants 

Colonel General Valery Gerasimov was the year's parade commander (his final parade appearance) while the Minister of Defence of the Russian Federation, Anatoly Serdyukov, in what would be his final parade review, was the parade reviewing officer.

 Military Bands 
 Massed Military Bands of the Armed Forces under the direction of the Senior Director of Music of the Military Bands Service of the Armed Forces of the Russian Federation, Lieutenant General Valery Khalilov
 Central Military Band of the Ministry of Defense of Russia 
 Central Navy Band of Russia
 Band of the Moscow Garrison
 Other military bands of military educational institutions and independent ministries
 Corps of Drums of the Moscow Military Music School

 Ground Column 
 154th Preobrazhensky Independent Commandant's Regiment Color Guard and Honor Guard Company of the 1st Honor Guard Battalion, 154th ICR
 Combined Arms Academy of the Armed Forces of the Russian Federation
 Military University of the Ministry of Defence of the Russian Federation
 Military Technical University of the Federal Agency of Special Construction
 Air Military Engineering University (first appearance)
 Fleet Admiral of the Soviet Union Nikolai Kuznetsov Naval Academy (first appearance)
 336th Independent Naval Infantry Brigade
 Military Space Academy "Alexander Mozhaysky"
 Yaroslav Air Defense Senior College of Rocket Training and Research (first appearance)
 Peter the Great Military Academy of the Strategic Missile Forces
 98th Guards Airborne Division
 29th and 34th Independent Railway Brigades of the Russian Railway Troops''' (first appearance)
 1st NBC Coastal Brigade 9th Chemical Disposal Regiment 45th Engineering Brigade Civil Defense Academy of the Ministry of Emergency Situations OMSDON Ind. Motorized Internal Troops Division of the Ministry of Internal Affairs of the Russian Federation "Felix Dzerzhinsky" Moscow Border Institute of the FSB
 5th Independent Tamanskaya Guards Motor Rifle Brigade "Mikhail Kalinin" 4th Independent Kantemirovkaya Guards Tank Brigade "Yuri Andropov" 9th Independent Guards Motor Rifle Brigade 27th Independent Sevastopol Guards Motor Rifle Brigade 288th Independent Warsaw-Brandenburg Artillery Brigade Moscow Military Commanders Training School "Supreme Soviet of Russia"''

Mobile Column 
 GAZ-2975 Tigr
 Iveco LMV (first appearance)
 BTR-80
 T-90A
 2S19 Msta
 Buk missile system
 Pantsir-S1
 S-400 Triumf
 Iskander-M 
 Topol-M

Air Column Flypast 
 Mil Mi-8 Hip Colors Party

Rehearsals for 2012 Moscow Victory Day Parade

See also 
 Victory Day (9 May)

References

Moscow Victory Day Parades
Moscow Victory Day Parade
2012 in military history
2012 in Moscow
May 2012 events in Russia